The 2013–14 FA Vase Final was the 40th final of the Football Association's cup competition for teams at levels 9-11 of the English football league system. The match was contested between Sholing, of the Wessex League Premier Division (level 9), and West Auckland Town, of the Northern League Division 1 (level 9).

Match

Details

References

2014
FA Vase Final
FA Vase Final
FA Vase Final
2014